David Ross Smith is a former ice hockey defenceman who played for Michigan just after World War II.

Career
Ross arrived in Michigan immediately after the war after graduating from De La Salle High School. He took the following year off before returning for the 1947–48 season. He played left defense for the best team in the country that season, earning AHCA First Team All-American honors and helping the Wolverines win the inaugural National Championship.

Ross played two more seasons with Michigan, helping the team reach the NCAA tournament two more years, but the team fell short both times. Ross was twice named team MVP and was inducted into the Dekers Club Hall of Fame in 1969.

Awards and honors

References

External links

Date of birth unknown
Canadian ice hockey defencemen
Michigan Wolverines men's ice hockey players
Ice hockey people from Toronto
NCAA men's ice hockey national champions
Possibly living people
Year of birth missing
AHCA Division I men's ice hockey All-Americans